The following lists events that happened in 1985 in Iceland.

Incumbents
President – Vigdís Finnbogadóttir 
Prime Minister – Steingrímur Hermannsson

Events

 November 14 - Hólmfríður Karlsdóttir is crowned Miss World at Royal Albert Hall in London, UK. It is the first Icelandic beauty pageant title.

Births

24 April – Baldur Sigurðsson, footballer
27 April – Dóra Stefánsdóttir, footballer
18 May – Guðbjörg Gunnarsdóttir, footballer
24 May – Björgvin Páll Gústavsson, handball player
15 July – Sif Atladóttir, footballer
29 July – Steinþór Freyr Þorsteinsson, footballer
5 October – Bergur Ingi Pétursson, hammer thrower.
28 October – Ásdís Hjálmsdóttir, javelin thrower.

Deaths
26 February – Guðmundur G. Hagalín, writer (b. 1898)
26 April – Björn Jónsson, politician (b. 1916).

References

 
1980s in Iceland
Iceland
Iceland
Years of the 20th century in Iceland